The 2008 Dallas Desperados season is the seventh season for the franchise. The Desperados finished the regular season 12–4, but despite having the second best record in the National Conference, they made the playoffs as the 3rd seed because they did not win their division. Their Wild Card round opponent was the New York Dragons, a team which the Desperados had defeated in both regular season meetings. The Dragons, unfortunately for the Desperados, won the game that counted the most of the three, eliminating the Desperados from the playoffs by a score of 77–63.

Standings

Regular season schedule

Playoff schedule

Coaching
Will McClay – Head Coach
Steve Criswell – Assistant OL/FB
Adriel Fenton – Defensive Quality Control/Special Teams Assistant
James Fuller – Defensive Coordinator/Special Teams
Tony Ollison – Strength and Conditioning Coach
Phill Penn – Assistant Strength and Conditioning Coach
Deatrich Wise – Dir. Player Programs/OL/DL/FB/LB

Roster

Stats

Regular season

Week 1: at Georgia Force

Week 2: vs. Columbus Destroyers

Week 3: vs. Colorado Crush

Week 4: at San Jose SaberCats

Week 5: at New York Dragons

Week 6: vs. Cleveland Gladiators

Week 7: vs. New Orleans VooDoo

Week 8
Bye Week

Week 9: at Philadelphia Soul

Week 10: at Columbus Destroyers

Week 11: vs. Grand Rapids Rampage

Week 12: vs. Arizona Rattlers

Week 13: at Orlando Predators

Week 14: at Cleveland Gladiators

Week 15: vs. Philadelphia Soul

Week 16: vs. New York Dragons

Week 17: at Chicago Rush

Playoffs

National Conference Wild Card: vs. (6) New York Dragons

Dallas Desperados
Dallas Desperados seasons
Dallas